Eleanor Calverley, M.D. (1887–1968) was the first medical missionary in Kuwait to gain the trust of Arab women who were forbidden to see male physicians.

Early life
Born in Woodstock, New Jersey, on March 24, 1887 to William Lewis and Jane Long Hillman Taylor, Calverley was educated in public schools of New Haven, Connecticut. She pursued a medical education at the Women's Medical College of Pennsylvania, graduating in 1908.  On September 6, 1909, Eleanor married Edwin Elliott Calverley, a missionary and scholar of Arabic and Islamic studies, with whom she trained for work in the Arabian Peninsula. They traveled together to Kuwait in 1911, and worked there for many years. They had three daughters: Grace, Elisabeth and Eleanor.

Work 
She was the first woman doctor in Kuwait.  To provide medical care to the general population and the Kuwaiti women in particular, she opened a small dispensary connected to her home. In 1919, under her leadership, the first women's hospital in Kuwait was established. In her memoir, she wrote:

References

Further reading
http://www.swvatoday.com/entertainment_life/article_e2fb7f0c-d060-11e5-95dd-33d6de1d8c63.html

American Protestant missionaries
Healthcare in Kuwait
Women's health
1887 births
1968 deaths
Protestant missionaries in Kuwait
Christian medical missionaries
Female Christian missionaries
20th-century American women physicians
20th-century American physicians